Narayani Bridge is a bridge on the East-West (Mahendra highway) of Nepal located in the central region of Nepal. The bridge connects Gaindakot municipality of Nawalparasi District on the western region of Nepal, with Narayanghat (Bharatpur, Nepal) city on the central development region. It has 15 large and round shaped pillars.

References 

Bridges in Nepal
1980s establishments in Nepal
Buildings and structures in Bharatpur, Nepal